Pynchon Park, also known as Hampden Park and League Park, was a sports venue in Springfield, Massachusetts. It was opened in 1853 by the Hampden Agricultural Society and was destroyed by fire in 1966.

The venue hosted various events, including horse racing, bicycle racing, and college football (including several editions of the Harvard–Yale football rivalry). It also served as home grounds for the minor league baseball team primarily known as the Springfield Ponies.

In 1885 and 1896, cycling's hour record was unofficially broken multiple times at Hampden Park.

College football

References

College baseball venues in the United States
Defunct baseball venues in Massachusetts
Sports venues in Springfield, Massachusetts
Velodromes in the United States
Defunct minor league baseball venues